Jugnauth is a surname. Notable people with the surname include:

Lall Jugnauth (1920–1970), Mauritian politician
Anerood Jugnauth (1930–2021), Mauritian politician
Ashock Jugnauth (born 1953), Mauritian politician
Pravind Jugnauth (born 1961), Mauritian politician